The Shawshank Redemption is the original soundtrack of the 1994 film The Shawshank Redemption starring Morgan Freeman, Tim Robbins, Bob Gunton, William Sadler, Clancy Brown, and others.

The original score was composed by Thomas Newman and released via the Epic Soundtrax label on September 20, 1994.

Track listing 
 May (0:33)
 Shawshank Prison (Stoic Theme) (1:53)
 New Fish (1:50)
 Rock Hammer (1:51)
 An Inch of His Life (2:48)
 "If I Didn't Care" by the Ink Spots (3:03)
 Brooks was Here (5:06)
 His Judgement Cometh (2:00)
 Suds on the Roof (1:36)
 Workfield (1:10)
 Shawshank Redemption (4:26)
 "Lovesick Blues" by Hank Williams (2:42)
 Elmo Blatch (1:08)
 Sisters (1:18)
 Zihuatanejo (4:43)
 "The Marriage of Figaro: Duettino - Sull'aria" performed by Edith Mathis, Gundula Janowitz, Orchestra of the Deutsche Oper Berlin, Karl Böhm (dir.) (3:32)
 Lovely Raquel (1:55)
 And That Right Soon (1:08)
 Compass and Guns (3:53)
 So was Red (2:44)
 End Title (4:05)

Shawshank Redemption track listing
DISC 1
 Main Title/Courtroom (5:12)
 Shawshank Prison (Stoic Theme) (1:54)
 Prison Entrance (:57)
 New Fish (1:53)
 Bogs’ Shower (1:24)
 Rock Hammer (2:01)
 First Rape (1:10)
 Sisters (1:20)
 May [Extended Version] (:59)
 Suds On The Roof (1:38)
 Carves Names (1:03)
 An Inch Of His Life [Film Version] (2:57)
 Horse Apple [Extended Version] (2:12)
 Bible (:55)
 Letters/Taxes 1:58
 Brooks Was Here [Extended Version] (5:02)
 Hope/Gift Exchange (2:38)
 Lovely Raquel (1:58)
 Elmo Blatch (1:14)
 Kid Passed/Wild Injuns (2:07)
 Zihuatanejo (4:49)
 Longest Night (1:58)
 And That Right Soon (1:16)
 Escape (1:40)
 Shawshank Redemption [Film Version] (4:31)
 His Judgement Cometh (2:04)
 Pacific/Graveyard (2:09)
 Compass And Guns [Film Version] (5:37)
 So Was Red (2:45)
 End Title (4:11)

DISC 2
 Shawshank Prison (Stoic Theme) [Alternate] (1:58)
 An Inch Of His Life [Album Version] (2:50)
 Hope [Alternate] (:55)
 Lovely Raquel [Alternate] (1:58)
 Kid Passed [Alternate] (1:00)
 And That Right Soon [Alternate] 1:16
 Shawshank Redemption [Album Version] 4:31
 His Judgement Cometh [Alternate] 2:02
 Pacific/Graveyard [Alternate] 2:11
 Compass And Guns [Extended Version] 5:35
 So Was Red [Alternate] 2:47
 End Title [Alternate Take] 4:18
 "If I Didn't Care" by the Ink Spots (3:05)
 "The Marriage of Figaro: Duettino - Sull'aria" performed by Edith Mathis, Gundula Janowitz, Orchestra of the Deutsche Oper Berlin, Karl Böhm (dir.) (3:38)
 "Lovesick Blues" by Hank Williams  (2:48)

Credits 
Artwork – Castle Rock Entertainment
Music By – Thomas Newman
Photography By – Castle Rock Entertainment
Producer – Bill Bernstein, Thomas Newman

Recognition 
The album was nominated for the Academy Award for Best Original Score and a Grammy Award: "Best Instrumental Composition Written for a Motion Picture or for Television" but lost both to The Lion King.

References 

1994 soundtrack albums
Classical music soundtracks
Drama film soundtracks
Epic Records soundtracks